Candy Brière-Vetillard (born 17 October 2003) is a French tumbling gymnast.

Career
At the 2021 European Championships in Sochi, Brière-Vetillard won the gold medal in the team event with Manon Morançais, Maëlle Dumitru-Marin and Lucie Tumoine; it was France's first title in this discipline since the 2000 European Championships in Eindhoven; she also won the bronze medal in individual. At the 2021 World Championships in Baku, she won the gold medal in the team event with Lucie Tumoine, Émilie Wambote and Maëlle Dumitru-Marin.

Brière-Vetillard won two gold medals at the 2022 European Championships in the individual and team events.

References

External links
 

2003 births
Living people
Sportspeople from Le Mans
French female trampolinists
World Games gold medalists
Competitors at the 2022 World Games
Medalists at the Trampoline Gymnastics World Championships
21st-century French women